The community of Thornhill is an unincorporated settlement of approximately 5000+ people on the east side of the Skeena River immediately across from the City of Terrace, British Columbia. It is connected to Terrace by the Old Skeena Bridge and the Dudley Little Bridge also known as 'the new bridge'.Thornhill has an independent volunteer Firefighting detachment and an educational system consisting of the schools: Thornhill Primary, Thornhill Elementary, and Thornhill Junior Secondary School, sustaining a combined total of approximately 700 students from kindergarten to Grade 10.

Integration with Terrace
Because of its contiguousness with Terrace along the Highway 16 corridor, many visitors and newcomers to the area consider Thornhill a part of Terrace. However that is now changing that signs are going up identifying Thornhill as a vibrant community with 5000+ residents.Its government is an electoral director's seat on the Kitimat–Stikine Regional District board.There have been discussions about developing a more independent system of local government in Thornhill (i.e. Incorporation) or amalgamating with the larger City of Terrace.
Terrace and Thornhill currently share the V8G postal code FSA, 250 area code and most phone number prefixes (635, 638, 615, 631 and 641 in order of introduction). High speed cable internet also provides "Home Phone" services with prefix 778, used in various locations throughout British Columbia (see Wikipedia "Area codes 778 and 236). Mail is properly addressed as being directed to Thornhill, BC specifically, is the correct way to address mail going to Thornhill as their postal code indicates Thornhill. 
Thornhill relies on Terrace for nothing. We pay for our policing,roads and use the regional medical services.

References

External links
 Map of Thornhill (Google Maps)
 Regional District of Kitimat–Stikine
 Thornhill Volunteer Fire Department

Unincorporated settlements in British Columbia
Populated places in the Regional District of Kitimat–Stikine